The World Single Distances Speed Skating Championships are a series of speed skating competitions organised by the International Skating Union.

History
Since the late 19th century, speed skating championships were always decided by racing multiple distances – four different distances for the Allround Championships, and two different distances (which have to be skated twice) for Sprint Championships. However, the speed skating events at the Olympic Games were always individual distances, no medals are awarded for a combined event (the only exception being the 1924 Winter Olympics).

Towards the end of the 20th century, skaters started to specialize and it became rare that a skater was able to dominate both the short and the long distances. Perhaps the last skater able to do so was Eric Heiden, who won all five distances at the 1980 Winter Olympics. As a consequence of this specialization, the difference between the Olympic Games and the regular championships, and the popularity of both the Speed skating World Cup and Single Distance Championships held nationally in several countries, the International Skating Union decided to organise the World Single Distance Championships.

Starting in 1996, this originally was an annual event, but in 1998 it became clear that having World Single Distance Championships and the Single Distance Championships as held at the Winter Olympics during the same year was too much, so since 1999, the World Single Distance Championships are no longer held in (Winter) Olympic years. In 2020 it became clear that having three different World Speed Skating Championships (Allround Championships, Sprint Championships and Single Distances Championships) within each non-Olympic year is difficult as well, so starting since 2021, the World Single Distance Championships are held only in an odd years.

Distances

The skaters compete in the following distances:

Summary

Medal summary
The medal table by nations is the total number of the 16 distances (men and women) at all of the 22 championships (1996–2023). The individual tables are about the eight distances by gender.

Nations
All medals, click on the nation to go to the list of medallists.

Men
Top 10, including team pursuit and team sprint. Boldface denotes active skaters and highest medal count among all skaters (including those who are not included in these tables) per type.

Women
Top 10, including team pursuit and team sprint. Boldface denotes active skaters and highest medal count among all skaters (including those who are not included in these tables) per type.

References

Single